Elmar Lichtenegger (born 25 May 1974 in Klagenfurt) is an Austrian hurdler.

His personal best time is 13.33 seconds, achieved in June 1999 in Athens.

Since 2003 he has been a member of the National Council of Austria, originally for the Freedom Party of Austria (FPÖ). In 2006 he joined the Alliance for the Future of Austria (BZÖ).

On 27 August 2008 Lichtenegger received a lifetime ban from international athletics competition due to his second positive test for the banned substance nandrolone.

Achievements

References

External links

1974 births
Living people
Austrian male hurdlers
Athletes (track and field) at the 1996 Summer Olympics
Athletes (track and field) at the 2000 Summer Olympics
Olympic athletes of Austria
Austrian politicians
Austrian sportsperson-politicians
Doping cases in athletics
Austrian sportspeople in doping cases
Universiade medalists in athletics (track and field)
Sportspeople from Klagenfurt
Universiade silver medalists for Austria
Medalists at the 2001 Summer Universiade